The exit status of a process in computer programming is a small number passed from a child process (or callee) to a parent process (or caller) when it has finished executing a specific procedure or delegated task.  In DOS, this may be referred to as an errorlevel.

When computer programs are executed, the operating system creates an abstract entity called a process in which the book-keeping for that program is maintained. In multitasking operating systems such as Unix or Linux, new processes can be created by active processes. The process that spawns another is called a parent process, while those created are child processes.  Child processes run concurrently with the parent process. The technique of spawning child processes is used to delegate some work to a child process when there is no reason to stop the execution of the parent.  When the child finishes executing, it exits by calling the exit system call.  This system call facilitates passing the exit status code back to the parent, which can retrieve this value using the wait system call.

Semantics
The parent and the child can have an understanding about the meaning of the exit statuses.  For example, it is common programming practice for a child process to return (exit with) zero to the parent signifying success.  Apart from this return value from the child, other information like how the process exited, either normally or by a signal may also be available to the parent process.

The specific set of codes returned is unique to the program that sets it. Typically it indicates success or failure. The value of the code returned by the function or program may indicate a specific cause of failure. On many systems, the higher the value, the more severe the cause of the error. Alternatively, each bit may indicate a different condition, with these being evaluated by the or operator together to give the final value; for example, fsck does this.

Sometimes, if the codes are designed with this purpose in mind, they can be used directly as a branch index upon return to the initiating program to avoid additional tests.

AmigaOS
In AmigaOS, MorphOS and AROS, four levels are defined:
 OK 0
 WARN 5
 ERROR 10
 FAILURE 20

Shell and scripts
Shell scripts typically execute commands and capture their exit statuses.

For the shell’s purposes, a command which exits with a zero exit status has succeeded. A nonzero exit status indicates failure. This seemingly counter-intuitive scheme is used so there is one well-defined way to indicate success and a variety of ways to indicate various failure modes. When a command is terminated by a signal whose number is N, a shell sets the variable $? to a value greater than 128. Most shells use 128+N, while ksh93 uses 256+N.

If a command is not found, the shell should return a status of 127. If a command is found but is not executable, the return status should be 126. Note that this is not the case for all shells.

If a command fails because of an error during expansion or redirection, the exit status is greater than zero.

C language
The C programming language allows programs exiting or returning from the main function to signal success or failure by returning an integer, or returning the macros EXIT_SUCCESS and EXIT_FAILURE. On Unix-like systems these are equal to 0 and 1 respectively.  A C program may also use the exit() function specifying the integer status or exit macro as the first parameter.

The return value from main is passed to the exit function, which for values zero, EXIT_SUCCESS or EXIT_FAILURE may translate it to “an implementation defined form” of successful termination or unsuccessful termination.

Apart from zero and the macros EXIT_SUCCESS and EXIT_FAILURE, the C standard does not define the meaning of return codes. Rules for the use of return codes vary on different platforms (see the platform-specific sections).

DOS
In DOS terminology, an errorlevel is an integer exit code returned by an executable program or subroutine. Errorlevels typically range from 0 to 255. In DOS there are only 256 error codes available, but DR DOS 6.0 and higher support 16-bit error codes at least in CONFIG.SYS. With 4DOS and DR-DOS COMMAND.COM, exit codes (in batchjobs) can be set by EXIT n and (in CONFIG.SYS) through ERROR=n.

Exit statuses are often captured by batch programs through IF ERRORLEVEL commands. Multiuser DOS supports a reserved environment variable %ERRORLVL% which gets automatically updated on return from applications. COMMAND.COM under DR-DOS 7.02 and higher supports a similar pseudo-environment variable %ERRORLVL% as well as %ERRORLEVEL%. In CONFIG.SYS, DR DOS 6.0 and higher supports ONERROR to test the load status and return code of device drivers and the exit code of programs.

Java
In Java, any method can call System.exit(int status), unless a security manager does not permit it. This will terminate the currently running Java Virtual Machine. "The argument serves as a status code; by convention, a nonzero status code indicates abnormal termination."

OpenVMS
In OpenVMS, success is indicated by odd values and failure by even values.
The value is a 32 bit integer with sub-fields: control bits, facility number, message number and severity. Severity values are divided between success (Success, Informational) and failure (Warning, Error, Fatal).

POSIX
In Unix and other POSIX-compatible systems, the parent process can retrieve the exit status of a child process using the wait() family of system calls defined in wait.h.  Of these, the waitid()  call retrieves the full 32-bit exit status, but the older wait() and waitpid()  calls retrieve only the least significant 8 bits of the exit status.

The wait() and waitpid() interfaces set a status value of type int packed as a bitfield with various types of child termination information.  If the child terminated by exiting (as determined by the WIFEXITED() macro; the usual alternative being that it died from an uncaught signal), SUS specifies that the low-order 8 bits of the exit status can be retrieved from the status value using the WEXITSTATUS() macro.

In the waitid() system call (added with SUSv1), the child exit status and other information are no longer in a bitfield but in the structure of type siginfo_t.

POSIX-compatible systems typically use a convention of zero for success and nonzero for error.  Some conventions have developed as to the relative meanings of various error codes; for example GNU recommend that codes with the high bit set be reserved for serious errors.

BSD-derived OS's have defined an extensive set of preferred interpretations: Meanings for 15 status codes 64 through 78 are defined in sysexits.h. These historically derive from sendmail and other message transfer agents, but they have since found use in many other programs.

The Advanced Bash-Scripting Guide and /usr/include/sysexits.h have some information on the meaning of non-0 exit status codes.

Windows
Windows uses 32-bit unsigned integers as exit codes, although the command interpreter treats them as signed.

Exit codes are directly referenced, for example, by the command line interpreter CMD.exe in the  errorlevel terminology inherited from DOS. .NET Framework processes and the Windows PowerShell refer to it as the ExitCode property of the Process object.

See also
 Error code
 Return statement
 true and false (commands)

References

Process (computing)